Old Colony Regional Vocational Technical High School or Old Colony Regional Vocational Technical High School District is located on an 80-acre campus in Rochester, Massachusetts, United States, the geographical center of the five-member town school district that includes Acushnet, Carver, Mattapoisett, Rochester and students from Freetown & Lakeville Public Schools. Note that Lakeville is a member town while, Freetown is not and its students served are limited to around 90. Old Colony is affectionately known as OC, Old Colony Regional, Old Colony RVTHS, OCRVTH, & OCRVTHS. Old Colony is fully accredited by the New England Association of Schools and Colleges, as well as the Massachusetts Department of Elementary and Secondary Education. Old Colony is a "Full Time" Vocational-Technical High School. So Old Colony has an academic department (see below).

Administrative staff 
Old Colony is its own district thus having a superintendent onsite, Mr. Aaron Polansky (Mr. Polansky's title is Superintendent-Director), replacing former superintendent Mr. Frank Cote. OC has one principal, and according to the school's website, Mr. J. Michael Parker has been named as the new principal, replacing former principal Mrs. Karen Guenette. The school also has a Dean of Students, Mr. Gary Linehan The school has a Special Services Coordinator, Ms. Krystla Fay. The school also has a CTE Director, Mrs. Bethany Botelho, replacing former CTE Director Ms. Jackie Machamer.

Post Old Colony

Graduates receive a high school diploma and a certificate of proficiency in their technical area of study.
Old Colony's four-year program of studies allows students to directly enter the job market as skilled workers or to continue their education at any college, university, or technical school. Their Tech/Prep Program guarantees admission to Bristol Community College after completing the two-year courses at Old Colony. Also, college credit can be awarded for technical training received at Old Colony from Wentworth Institute, New England Institute of Technology, and Johnson & Wales University.

Transportation to Old Colony

Member towns
Old Colony Students from Acushnet, Carver, Mattapoisett, Lakeville, and Rochester take buses provided by Old Colony who contracts First Student

Non-member town
Freetown is not a member of the district thus they do not take buses provided by OC. Those students, in the morning, take a bus from Apponequet Regional and then transfer to a bus at Apponequet that takes them to Old Colony.
In the afternoon, these students take a bus from Old Colony and the buses run on a limited Apponequet route. Buses for Freetown are provided by Freetown-Lakeville who contract First Student.

After school late bus
On days students can stay after, Tuesdays (if funded) and Thursdays, and take a "late bus" home. The late bus is only offered only to member towns. Freetown students can stay but they must get a ride home.

Vocational-technical programs

Old Colony offers thirteen vocational-technical programs. All programs fall under Massachusetts General Law (M.G.L.) Chapter 74. These programs are commonly referred to as "Shops".
 Automotive Technology
 Business Technology
 Computer Science
 Cosmetology (Often Abbreviated to Cosmo)
 Culinary Arts
 Computer Aided Design Drafting (Often Abbreviated to CAD Drafting or CADD)
 Electrical
 Electronics
 Health Careers (Often Abbreviated to Health)
 House and Mill Carpentry (Often Abbreviated to Carpentry)
 Machine and Tool Technology
 Graphic Communication and Design (Often Abbreviated to Graphics)
 Welding/Metal Fabrication (Often Abbreviated to Welding)

Related class
During the academic cycle, students have a related class.  Sophomores have only one period of related every day, while juniors and seniors have two periods of related every day. This class teaches students curriculum that can not always be taught in shop. Starting in the 2013–14 school year freshmen and sophomores in the 2014–15 school year will have related one period out of their shop class. (It is currently unknown if that will be followed in the future for their full high school career.)

Exploratory program 

The Old Colony Shop Exploratory Program freshmen students "explore" 8 six shops, five of their choosing and 3 chosen by the guidance department in most cases. Students explore shop related classes, during academic cycles, and shop classes, during shop cycle. Students partake in this program during the first trimester, (and into the second for the last two) of the school year and then are assigned their shop. Students will learn how competitive the work force can be because most shops can be very competitive. Students also partake in a course about OSHA, Occupational Safety and Health Act of 1970, the EPA, and procedures at Old Colony which takes place one day a week during related weeks.  The students take a test on their last related week in related class.

Academics
As Old Colony RVTHS is "full-time" school so they have an academic department. Old Colony currently (2012-2013 school year) has 21 academic staff members (22 including the Librarian). They each fall under a sub-category. (All courses listed below are based on the 2017-2018 school year)

English
The department facilitates:
 Proficiency in reading and writing skills
 Computer literacy skills
 Researching capabilities in accordance with the latest MLA and electronic documentation criteria
 Oral presentation and public speaking experience
 Literary exposure through classic and contemporary genres
 MCAS preparation
 Components for professional career and/or college portfolios

English courses are offered in honors and college prep for grades 9-12.

Math
The Mathematics Department implements curriculum aligned with the Massachusetts Mathematics Curriculum Frameworks. The department uses a variety of instructional methods to meet the needs of all learners and to develop an understanding and appreciation of mathematics, especially as it applies to vocational areas. The curriculum prepares students for both the workforce and post-secondary education. As an extra-curricular activity, Old Colony has a Math Team that enters into math competitions.

Physical Education
This department offers Health and Physical Education classes.

Sports 
Old Colony has numerous varsity sports available for all students to play throughout the school year. Old Colony plays in the Mayflower Athletic Conference and are part of the small division. The school's athletic director is Mr. Matt Trahan.

The sports offered are:

Fall:
 Boys Soccer
 Cheerleading
 Cross Country (Co-ed)
 Football
 Girls Soccer
 Girls Volleyball
 Golf
Winter:
 Boys Basketball
 Girls Basketball
 Cheerleading
 Ice Hockey 
Spring:
 Baseball
 Boys Lacrosse
 Girls Lacrosse
 Softball

References

Educational institutions established in 1975
Public high schools in Massachusetts
Rochester, Massachusetts
Schools in Plymouth County, Massachusetts
1975 establishments in Massachusetts